Ariana University Volleyball Club (Arabic: النادي الجامعي باريانة, English:  Ariana University or UCA) is a Tunisian women's Volleyball team based in Ariana Town, founded in 1995. It is currently playing in the Tunisian Women's Volleyball League Top Division, The Club won the Tunisian Championship in 1998 and the Tunisian Volleyball Cup in 1997.

Honours

National titles

 Tunisian Volleyball League 1 :
 Champions : 1997–98
 Vice Champion : 1998–99

 Tunisian Volleyball Cup 1 :
 Champions : 1996–97
 Runners Up :  2005–06, 2009–10

Regional honours

 Arab Clubs Championship 0 :
 Runners-up : 1998
 Bronze Medalist : 1999

Current squad 2017–18

References

External links
Official Club Page 
 Official Page Facebook

Tunisian volleyball clubs
Volleyball clubs established in 1995
1995 establishments in Tunisia